IIX may refer to:

 Indonesia Internet Exchange
 Israeli Internet Exchange
 Macintosh IIx